Gaston Relens (Mechelen, 9 March 1909 – Schaarbeek, 4 June 2011) was a Belgian painter working in Schaarbeek. He was taught by Gustave van de Woestijne at the Academy of Fine Arts in Mechelen (1930–1935) and later on by Anto Carte at the Academy of Fine Arts in Brussels.

Biography 

Gaston Relens was raised in Hofstade by his beloved stepparents, “father Fons” Van Erp and “mother Lies” Trouwkens. Originally he was trained to become a brazier. But he enrolled for the evening classes drawing and painting at the Academy of Mechelen. Later on he continued at the Academy of Brussels.

In 1937 he obtained the first prize for painting summa cum laude and the golden medal of the Belgian government for his painting “The Battle at Woeringen”. During the war he was obliged to find a job to make a living and stopped painting until 1957. His interest in painting however did not fall, and he continued visiting numerous exhibitions. At that time he worked in the local administration of Hofstade . Sometime later he was engaged as technical draughtsman by Eternit in Kapelle-op-den-Bos. In 1947 he married Andrée Dongrie and they settled in Schaarbeek. He also did some work at the Ministry of Defence. From 1979 onwards he often retreated to the calm of his farmhouse in Ogy to do his painting.

He was very sensitive to the joys and sorrows of his fellow human beings, which helps to explain his choice of topics: the farm labour, the loneliness of the blind man in the big city, the dangers and threats of war, the ups and downs of social life, the lost paradise, the unchanging rhythm of the seasons. At first he was influenced by expressionism, but very soon there was an evolution towards magic realism and symbolism, which delight us by the magnificent display of colour and the subtle harmony. The rich and delicate range of colouring transcends reality and turns into poetry.

Numerous exhibitions have been held, especially in Brussels, Ghent, Antwerp, Mechelen, Lier, Genève, Villeneuve d’Ascq and Leiden. Two important retrospectives have taken place, in Mechelen, at the Cultureel Centrum Antoon Spinoy, from 6 October till 4 November 1990, and at the town hall of Schaarbeek, from 6 till 30 April 1991.

Gaston Relens lived in Rue de la Ruche / Bijenkorfstraat 43 in Schaarbeek.

Bibliography 
 André Dussart, Relens, Schoonaarde, 1976
 Nicole Verschoore, avant-propos de Paul Caso, Relens, Bruxelles : L. de Meyer, 1980
 Jacques Collard, Gaston Relens, Sur l'aile de la fantaisie, in: 50 artistes de Belgique II, Bruxelles, 1986
 Alfons De Bleser, introduction by Remy De Cnodder, Gaston Relens, Sint-Niklaas, 1990
 Raymond Lacroix, René Turkry et André Dussart, Gaston Relens, Gemeente Schaarbeek, retrospective from 6th till 30 April 1991
 Raymond Lacroix, Wim Toebosch, Gaston Relens, Bruxelles : Mercenart, Art poche, 1996
 Joost De Geest, Relens, Bruxelles : Ars Libris, L. De Meyer-Nicolas Poncelet, 1997

External links 
 Dictionnaire des peintres belges

Belgian painters
1909 births
Artists from Mechelen
2011 deaths